Hongu may refer to:
Hongu, Iran (disambiguation)
Hongū, Wakayama, Japan
Hongu River, in Nepal
Mount Hongū, in Japan
Hongū Station, in Japan